Weybourne Cliffs is a  biological and geological Site of Special Scientific Interest at Weybourne, west of Sheringham in the English county of Norfolk. It is a Geological Conservation Review site. It is in the Norfolk Coast Area of Outstanding Natural Beauty.

This Pleistocene site is the type locality for the Pastonian Weybourne Crag Formation, and its fossils of marine molluscs have been studied for 200 years. Its ecological interest lies in colonies of sand martins in the cliffs.

The beach is open to the public.

References

Sites of Special Scientific Interest in Norfolk
Geological Conservation Review sites